Selce ( or ) is a settlement in the Slovene Hills in the Municipality of Lenart in northeastern Slovenia. The area is part of the traditional region of Styria. The entire municipality is now included in the Drava Statistical Region.

References

External links
Selce on Geopedia

Populated places in the Municipality of Lenart